Jules Bailey (born November, 1979) is an American politician who served in the Oregon House of Representatives from 2009 to 2014, representing inner Southeast and Northeast Portland. Bailey also served on the County Commission for Multnomah County, Oregon from June 2014 to December 2016. In 2016, Bailey ran for mayor of Portland in 2016, losing to Ted Wheeler. In January 2017, he began working for the Oregon Beverage Recycling Cooperative as the chief stewardship officer, and as the CEO in January 2023.

Early life and education 
Bailey was raised in Portland, Oregon and graduated from Lincoln High School. He earned a bachelor's degree in Lewis & Clark College and received MPA/URP from Princeton University

Bailey studied in a dual-degree graduate program at Princeton University's Woodrow Wilson School of Public and International Affairs. In 2007, he earned two master's degrees: a Master of Public Affairs (with concentrations in Economic Policy and Environmental Policy) and a Master of Urban and Regional Planning.

Career

Elections 

In 2008, Bailey was elected to the Oregon House of Representatives to represent District 42. The seat was vacated by Diane Rosenbaum, who was running for election to the Oregon Senate. Bailey earned a plurality victory in the primary election over three other candidates for the Democratic nomination. In the general election, he defeated Pacific Green Party candidate Chris Extine to win election to the seat. Bailey was reelected to the Oregon House of Representatives in 2010 with 84.7% of the vote and in 2012, when he was unopposed in both the primary and general elections.

Policy issues 

In the 2013–2014 legislative session, Bailey served as Chairman of the House Energy and Environment Committee. He also chaired the Joint Committee on Tax Credits.

In 2013, Bailey angered some environmentalists by voting in favor of the Columbia River Crossing mega highway project, which was projected to increase greenhouse gas emissions 32% in the area by 2030 if built; he was presented with the mock environmental "Cars Rejuvenating Carbon" award during an Oregon League of Conservation Voters event shortly after the vote in the Oregon House.

Bailey worked to encourage bicycle transportation. He sponsored bills to increase state funding for biking and walking facilities and to allow an Idaho stop for cyclists. He also sponsored a bill to make traffic fines proportional to vehicle weight in order to recognize that heavier vehicles, when driven dangerously, are more hazardous to the people around them than small vehicles.

Multnomah County Commissioner 

From June 2014 to the end of 2016, Bailey represented District 1, which includes the areas of Multnomah County west of the Willamette River and inner Southeast Portland, on the Multnomah County Commission. Bailey was elected to the Multnomah County Commission in a special election in May 2014. He succeeded Liesl Wendt, who had been appointed to fill the seat on an interim basis when Deborah Kafoury resigned to run for County Chair. Bailey defeated community activist Brian Wilson, winning 73.1% of the vote. During his tenure on the Commission, Bailey focused on homelessness, easing the process of financing seismic and energy conservation upgrades to commercial buildings, and funding seismic resiliency upgrades for bridge infrastructure.

Portland Mayoral Campaign 
See Also: 2016 Portland, Oregon mayoral election

In November 2015, Bailey announced his campaign for Portland mayor to take on Oregon State Treasurer Ted Wheeler. Bailey won a progressive and populist campaign compared to Wheeler's moderate campaign. Bailey voluntarily limited campaign contributions to $250.00, while Wheeler did not and was criticized for taking money from out of town sources. Bailey ended up losing, coming in second place with 31,955 votes (16.6%) compared to Wheeler's 105,562 votes (54.7%).

Personal life 
In September 2020, Bailey filed an elections complaint against Portland mayoral candidate Sarah Iannarone alleging that she is misleading voters about her educational credentials.

See also 
 Oregon legislative elections, 2008
 75th Oregon Legislative Assembly (2009–2010)
 76th Oregon Legislative Assembly (2011–2012)
 77th Oregon Legislative Assembly (2013–2014)

References 

1979 births
Living people
Lewis & Clark College alumni
Lincoln High School (Portland, Oregon) alumni
Oregon Democrats
Politicians from Portland, Oregon
Princeton School of Public and International Affairs alumni
21st-century American politicians